Oleria onega, the Onega clearwing or Onega glasswing, is a species of butterfly of the family Nymphalidae. It is found from Colombia to southern Peru.

The wingspan is about 52 mm.

The larvae feed on Solanum species. The young larvae are transparent and consume their egg shell before beginning to feed on the host plant. After each moult the caterpillar consumes its shed skin. Full-grown larvae are grey, with a yellow line along the length of the body on each side.

Subspecies
Oleria onega onega (Brazil (Amazonas))
Oleria onega ilerda (Hewitson, [1854]) (Colombia)
Oleria onega epicharme (C. & R. Felder, 1862) (Brazil (Amazonas), Peru)
Oleria onega janarilla (Hewitson, 1863) (Ecuador)
Oleria onega crispinilla (Hopffer, 1874) (Peru)
Oleria onega perspicua (Butler, 1877) (Brazil (Amazonas))
Oleria onega lerida (Kirby, 1878) (Ecuador)
Oleria onega janarilla (Hewitson, 1863)
Oleria onega bocca (Riley, 1919) (Brazil (Amazonas))
Oleria onega lentita Lamas, 1985  (Peru)

References

Ithomiini
Fauna of Brazil
Nymphalidae of South America